Time in Qatar is given by Arabia Standard Time (AST) (UTC+03:00). Qatar does not currently observe daylight saving time.

References

Qatar